René Schick Gutiérrez (23 November 1909 – 3 August 1966) was President of Nicaragua from 1 May 1963 to 3 August 1966, but was considered a puppet politician of Luis Somoza. He was born in León, Nicaragua and was a relative of his successor Lorenzo Guerrero, who served as one of Schick's vice presidents. He previously served as Foreign Minister from 1961 to 1962. He visited the United States in June 1966, meeting with President, Lyndon B. Johnson on June 9.  He died in office on 3 August 1966 in Managua at the age of 56.

References

1909 births
1966 deaths
People from León, Nicaragua
Presidents of Nicaragua
Foreign Ministers of Nicaragua
Permanent Representatives of Nicaragua to the United Nations
Ambassadors of Nicaragua to Venezuela
Nationalist Liberal Party politicians
Grand Crosses 1st class of the Order of Merit of the Federal Republic of Germany